Harry Osborne may refer to:

 Harry Osborne (EastEnders), a character on the soap opera EastEnders
 Harry Osborne (philatelist) (1875–1959), British medical practitioner and philatelist

See also
 Harry Osborn, a Marvel Comics character
 Harold Osborn (disambiguation)
 Henry Osborne (disambiguation)
 Henry Osborn (disambiguation)